Scrobipalpa argentea is a moth in the family Gelechiidae. It was described by Povolný in 1969. It is found in Afghanistan.

The forewings are uniform shining silvery with grey black-tipped scales at the apex. The hindwings are also shining silvery, but more transparent.

References

Scrobipalpa
Moths described in 1969
Taxa named by Dalibor Povolný